The Ministry of Health Promotion and Sport in the Canadian province of Ontario was responsible for the promotion of healthy living and disease prevention in the province. Between 2005 and July 2010, the organization's name was the Ministry of Health Promotion.

The ministry was created in 2005 by the government of Dalton McGuinty. The first Minister of Health Promotion was Jim Watson; the second and last minister was Margarett Best.

Following the 2011 Ontario general election, the ministry was merged into the Ministry of Health and Long-Term Care.

The EatRight Ontario Service
The EatRight Ontario service was launched in 2007.  It is funded by the Ontario Ministry of Health Promotion and Sport, and is operated by Dietitians of Canada.
It was created to support the Healthy Eating Active Living Strategy of providing residents of Ontario with trusted healthy eating advice from Registered Dietitians.  Healthy eating is a key factor in wellness, and prevention of chronic diseases, such as diabetes, obesity, heart disease and cancer.
There are three easy ways to reach a Registered Dietitian at EatRight Ontario:
 Call this toll-free number: 1-877-510-510-2 and speak directly with an RD.
 Send a question to the Email a Dietitian service.  You'll receive a personalized response within three business days.
 Visit the website for articles, menu plans, videos and recipes.

See also 
 Health promotion

References

External links
 Ministry of Health Promotion and Sport

Health Promotion
Medical and health organizations based in Ontario
Health promotion
Health education organizations
Health education in Canada
Ontario